The Queen Elizabeth Planetarium or Queen  Planetarium is a planetarium located in Coronation Park in Edmonton, Alberta, Canada. It was the first public planetarium in Canada, operating between 1960 and 1983. Designed by Walter Tefler and R. F. Duke, it was named to commemorate the visit of Elizabeth II in 1959. The planetarium is now operated by the Edmonton Space Sciences Foundation.

History
In 1958 a proposal was put before Edmonton City Council to build a permanent civic memorial to mark the visit of Queen Elizabeth and Prince Philip in July 1959. Originally there were three projects proposed on a 30.8 metre (94 foot) trilon, a three-sided equilateral prism, which would symbolize the three levels of government. Its likely design would have been as a three-sided obelisk, however, no plans or drawings were able to be located on the proposed structure. Another suggestion was a fountain, and the park itself.

Alderman Frederick John Mitchell proposed that an observatory be added onto the list, which seems to have been at the expense of the latter two options, as neither of these items was mentioned again in subsequent documents. A third option was conceived of by S. Frank Page (Assistant Secretary and editor of  Stardust, the newsletter of the Royal Astronomical Society of Canada – Edmonton Centre) in approximately November 1958, when he suggested that a planetarium be constructed as he anticipated that city lights would interfere with an observatory. The planetarium project proposal was supported by the City Council in December 1959 and passed the Financial Committee in March 1959. In July of that year the Queen visited the site during her tour.

A committee was formed consisting of Professor E. S. Keeping, Professor Gads, Franklin Loehde, F. Jersen, D. Rosenfield, and Earl Milton to put together a proposal for submission to the City Council. On December 21, 1959, H. J. McKim Ross of the Montgomery Branch of the Royal Canadian Legion made a motion that was passed unanimously supporting the project in principle. In March 1959 the planetarium proposal passed the hurdle of the finance committee with an estimated cost of $110,000.

On Monday March 9, 1959 the proposal to construct a planetarium in Coronation Park was approved by City Council by a margin of seven to four.

During the Queen's visit in July 1959 Mayor William Hawrelak made the following dedication speech in Coronation Park:

“Your most gracious Majesty, we most humbly pray that you may be pleased to be assured of the sincere and enduring loyalty of the people of the City of Edmonton. Your devoted subjects desire respectfully to extend to your Majesty and to His Royal Highness Prince Philip, a most cordial and enthusiastic welcome to Coronation Park.

“You have now set foot on an area of Canadian soil that was named in honour of your coronation as Queen and Sovereign of the British Empire.

“We trust that the character of the welcome the citizens of Edmonton extend to you here will be in keeping with the spirit of your visit.

“In commemoration of this royal visit in the year of our Lord nineteen hundred and fifty-nine, it is the wish of your loyal and devoted people to erect a building of masonry, brick, and stone at this location. A structure that will serve during the years ahead as a practical and pleasurable monument to perpetuate the memory of this great occasion. The aesthetic value of this Planetarium will soon give the development of the Canadian parkland, an additional beauty dedicated to the welfare and convenience of our citizens. May it always be in keeping with the spirit in which you come to us, friendly, warm hearted and sincere.

“We respectfully request of your Majesty’s permission to name this building The Queen  Planetarium. In your presence today we humbly demonstrate our allegiance, our gratitude and our affection.”

The official opening ceremonies were held on Thursday September 22, 1960. Mayor Elmer Ernest Roper dedicated the building, and a message of congratulations from the Queen's Secretary was read by Chief Justice C. J. Forward of the Alberta Supreme Court. Professor E. S. Keeping represented the University of Alberta and presented a sixty-eight pound fragment of the Bruderheim meteorite to the planetarium. The fragment was made the centre piece of the building's astronomical display. Also present was James Harrington of Leduc, Alberta, then president of the Edmonton Centre of the Royal Astronomical Society of Canada.

The first Director of the Planetarium was Ian McLennan, a member of the Edmonton Centre of the Royal Astronomical Society of Canada. He served in this position from August 22, 1960, to October 31, 1965, when he moved on to become the director of Strasenburgh Planetarium in Rochester, New York.

With the opening of the Queen  Planetarium on September 22, 1960, it became the first such public facility in Canada. The second public planetarium on Canadian soil was opened February 11, 1966 in Montreal. During McLennan's directorship much of the work at the planetarium was done by volunteers of the Royal Astronomical Society of Canada. Eventually though a full-time lecturer and receptionist had to be hired.

McLennan was succeeded in his position by David Rodger who took over on November 1, 1965; his short term of office lasted until July 31, 1967, when he was appointed as Director of the H. R. MacMillan Planetarium in Vancouver, British Columbia. During Rodgers’ directorship the planetarium produced its most successful shows. The popularity of this attraction can be seen in the fact that the 25,000th person saw a show on July 4, 1966. In 1967 an attendance record of 33,500 was reached. Shortly thereafter the staff position of technician was added. The person hired for this position was William Cable.

The next director was William Cable, who took over on August 2, 1967. During Cable's directorship the involvement of the Edmonton Centre of the Royal Astronomical Society of Canada was reduced considerably. In addition attendance dropped from the 33,000 in 1967 to 12,500 in 1972. Cable left the planetarium in 1972.

John Hault took over as director on January 5, 1973, and remained in the position until the planetarium closed on December 31, 1983. He then moved on to become the director of the Edmonton Space Sciences Centre (now Telus World of Science Edmonton).

Current status

The Queen Elizabeth II Planetarium was designed to be the main focal point of Coronation Park. At the time of its construction, and for a few years afterward the planetarium was the only structure in Coronation Park. Coronation Pool was started in 1967 as a Centennial project and was opened in 1970. The Coronation Arena was opened in 1970, and the Commonwealth Lawn Bowling Club was constructed between 1975 & 1978. The planetarium was hampered by a seating capacity of only 65. It closed at the end of 1983 and was superseded by the adjacent Edmonton Space Sciences Centre, finished in 1983. The Edmonton Space Sciences Centre is now known as Telus World of Science.

Since closing the planetarium has remained vacant, falling into a poor state of repair. In late 2004 two separate applications were submitted to the Historical Resources Development Board by Dale Nosko and Howard Gibbins. With the assistance of Mr. Robert Geldart these proposals were put forward to the board and passed by the Historical Resources Review Panel on May 31, 2005. According to Mr. Geldart, "They agreed that the Planetarium is worthy of being on the A list!" The next step was for the applications to go before the Edmonton Historical Board which happened in late June. They also agreed that the building should be added to the "A" list. The next, and last step was for the General Manager of the Planning and Development Department to pass the application which happened in late August. He subsequentially sent a letter to Community Services saying that The Queen  Planetarium has been added to the "A" list of historic resources within the City of Edmonton. In November 2016, the city announced plans to restore the planetarium and grant it full heritage status, which it did in March 2017.

The restored planetarium was originally scheduled to open by the end of 2019 in time for the 2020 International Planetarium Society Conference held in Edmonton in June, though the reopening was later pushed back to spring of 2020, and again to fall of 2021.

References

External links

 Official web site of the Telus World of Science, Edmonton
 Queen Elizabeth II Planetarium - Canada's First Public Planetarium

Museums in Edmonton
Science museums in Canada
Planetaria in Canada
Defunct planetaria
Municipal Historic Resources of Edmonton